Brigadier-General Henry Robert Kelham  (1853 – 4 October 1931) was a senior British Army officer.

Military career
Kelham was commissioned into the 74th (Highland) Regiment of Foot on 28 May 1873. He fought at the Battle of Tell El Kebir in September 1882 during the Anglo–Egyptian War. and then served as commanding officer of the 3rd Battalion Highland Light Infantry during the Second Boer War for which he was mentioned in dispatches. He went on to become General Officer Commanding Lowland Division in April 1908 before retiring in March 1910.

References

1853 births
1931 deaths
British Army brigadiers
Companions of the Order of the Bath
Highland Light Infantry officers